In the early years of the 20th century, rhymed lyric poetry, usually expressing the feelings of the poet, was the dominant poetic form in America, Europe and the British colonies. The relevance and acceptability of the lyric in the modern age was, though, called into question by modernism, the growing mechanization of human experience and the harsh realities of war. After the Second World War the form was again championed by the New Criticism, and in the late 20th century lyric once again became a mainstream poetic form.

Modernism
The dominance of lyric was challenged by American experimental modernists such as Ezra Pound, T. S. Eliot, H.D. and William Carlos Williams, who rejected the English lyric form of the 19th century, feeling that it relied too heavily on melodious language, rather than complexity of thought. Wallace Stevens and Hart Crane, however, were modernists who also worked within the tradition of post-Romantic lyric poetry. Defenders of lyric poetry in the early 20th century saw it as an ally in the fight against mechanization, standardization and the commodification of human activities. The poetry of Guillaume Apollinaire represents an alternative view, that mechanization could extend the repertoire of lyric poetry.

The First World War
The tension between the traditional subjects of lyric poetry and the horrors of war are expressed in the war poetry of Wilfred Owen, Siegfried Sassoon and Ivor Gurney. Owen's poem Strange Meeting has been described as "a dream of a conversation with a dead lyric poet, or possibly even dead lyric itself." The Irish poet William Butler Yeats's work up to 1917 is predominantly dramatic and lyric love poetry, but after the First World War he explores the political subjects of Irish independence, nationalism and civil war.

New Criticism
The American New Criticism returned to the lyric in the 1950s, advocating a poetry that made conventional use of rhyme, meter and stanzas, and was modestly personal in the lyric tradition. Lyric poets consistent with the New Criticism ethos include Robert Frost and Robert Lowell. In the 1950s long personal epics, such as Allen Ginsberg's "Howl" were a reaction against the well-wrought short lyric of the New Criticism.

Confessional poetry
Lyric poetry dealing with relationships, sex and domestic life constituted the new mainstream of American poetry in the late 20th century, influenced by the confessional poets of the 1950s and 1960s, such as Frank O'Hara, John Berryman, Sylvia Plath and Anne Sexton. In India, confessional poetry was introduced by the members of the Bengali Hungry generation poets, especially by Malay Roy Choudhury.

Other notable 20th-century lyric poets
UK
Dylan Thomas
J.R.R. Tolkien
Robert Graves
Geoffrey Hill
Ted Hughes
Canada
P. K. Page
George Bowering
France
Paul Éluard
Max Jacob
Paul Valéry
Blaise Cendrars
Germany
Gottfried Benn
Bertolt Brecht
Paul Celan
Stefan George
Rainer Maria Rilke
Israel / Palestine 
Yehuda Amichai
Mahmoud Darwish
Leah Goldberg 
Italy
Eugenio Montale
Giuseppe Ungaretti
Latvia
Zinaida Lazda (pseudonym of Zinaida Sreibere)
Lithuania
Jonas Aistis 
Janina Degutytė
Sigitas Geda
Antanas A. Jonynas
Pranciška Regina Liubertaitė
Maironis
Vincas Mykolaitis-Putinas
Justinas Marcinkevičius
Salomėja Neris
Henrikas Radauskas
Liūnė Sutema
Paulius Širvys
Tomas Venclova
Poland
Czesław Miłosz
Zbigniew Herbert
Wisława Szymborska
Portugal
Fernando Pessoa
Brasil
Manuel Bandeira
Mário de Andrade
Mário Quintana
Russia
Alexander Blok
Anna Akhmatova
Marina Tsvetaeva
Osip Mandelstam
Vladimir Mayakovsky
Boris Pasternak
Sergei Yesenin
Joseph Brodsky
Bella Akhmadulina
Andrei Voznesensky
Nicaragua
Rubén Darío
Spain
Federico García Lorca
Antonio Machado
Chile
Gabriela Mistral
Pablo Neruda
Mexico
Octavio Paz
Turkey
Nazim Hikmet
Bengal
Jibanananda Das 
Shakti Chattopadhyay

References

Genres of poetry
Poetry movements